This is a list of the songs that reached number one in Mexico in 1993, according to the Notitas Musicales magazine with data provided by Radio Mil(which also provided charts for Billboard's "Hits of the World" between 1969 and 1981).

Notitas Musicales was a bi-weekly magazine that published two record charts:

"Canciones que México canta" ("Songs that Mexico sings"), which listed the Top 10 most popular Spanish-language songs in Mexico, and
"Éxitos internacionales en México" ("International hits in Mexico"), which listed the most popular songs in Mexico that were in languages other than Spanish.

Chart history

See also
1993 in music

References

Sources
Print editions of the Notitas Musicales magazine.

1993 in Mexico
Mexico
Lists of number-one songs in Mexico